Bob Pinkney (born c. 1934) is a former Canadian football player who played for the Ottawa Rough Riders. He played college football at the University of Toronto.

References

Living people
1934 births
Canadian football running backs
Toronto Varsity Blues football players
Ottawa Rough Riders players